KRXY (94.5 FM, "94.5 Roxy") is a radio station broadcasting a hot adult contemporary music format. Licensed to Shelton, Washington, United States, the station is currently owned by Olympia Broadcasters, Inc.

References

External links
94.5 Roxy Online

RXY
Hot adult contemporary radio stations in the United States
Mason County, Washington